Air-gap malware is malware that is designed to defeat the air-gap isolation of secure computer systems using various air-gap covert channels.

Operation
Because most modern computers, especially laptops, have built-in microphones and speakers, air-gap malware can be designed to communicate secure information acoustically, at frequencies near or beyond the limit of human hearing. The technique is limited to computers in close physical proximity (about ), and is also limited by the requirement that both the transmitting and receiving machines be infected with the proper malware to form the communication link. The physical proximity limit can be overcome by creating an acoustically linked mesh network, but is only effective if the mesh network ultimately has a traditional Ethernet connection to the outside world by which the secure information can be removed from the secure facility. In 2014, researchers introduced ″AirHopper″, a bifurcated attack pattern showing the feasibility of data exfiltration from an isolated computer to a nearby mobile phone, using FM frequency signals.

In 2015, "BitWhisper", a covert signaling channel between air-gapped computers using thermal manipulations was introduced. "BitWhisper" supports bidirectional communication and requires no additional dedicated peripheral hardware.

Later in 2015, researchers introduced "GSMem", a method for exfiltrating data from air-gapped computers over cellular frequencies. The transmission - generated by a standard internal bus - renders the computer into a small cellular transmitter antenna.

In 2016, researchers categorized various "out-of-band covert channels" (OOB-CCs), which are malware communication channels that require no specialized hardware at the transmitter or receiver. OOB-CCs are not as high-bandwidth as conventional radio-frequency channels; however, they are capable of leaking sensitive information that require low data rates to communicate (e.g., text, recorded audio, cryptographic key material).

In 2020, researchers of ESET Research reported Ramsay Malware, a cyber espionage framework and toolkit that collects and steals sensitive documents like Word documents from systems on air-gapped networks.

In general, researchers demonstrated that air-gap covert channels can be realized over a number of different mediums, including:
 acoustic
 light
 seismic
 magnetic
 thermal
 radio-frequency
 physical media

See also 
 Air gap (networking)
 BadBIOS

References

Further reading
 
 
 

Types of malware